Poor Relations is a 1919 comedy novel by the British writer Compton Mackenzie. In contrast to the grimmer Sylvia and Michael published the same year, the story was a light-hearted comedy about the ups-and-downs of playwright.

It was followed by a sequel April Fools in 1930.

References

Further reading 
 
 David Joseph Dooley. Compton Mackenzie. Twayne Publishers, 1974.

1919 British novels
Novels by Compton Mackenzie